Oljath (Öljätäi) was a Queen consort of Georgia as the wife of two successive kings, Vakhtang II (r. 1289–1292) and David VIII (r. 1292–1311). She was a daughter of Abaqa Khan, the Mongol Ilkhan of Iran.

Origin
Oljath was a younger daughter of Abaqa. Her mother was either Abaqa's wife Maria Palaiologina, an illegitimate daughter of the Byzantine emperor Michael VIII Palaiologos, or Bulujin egechi, a concubine. She was, thus, a great-great-granddaughter of Genghis Khan.

First marriage
The anonymous 14th-century Chronicle of a Hundred Years, part of the Georgian Chronicles, relates that, after having Demetrius II of Georgia put to death in 1289, the Ilkhan Arghun sent the influential Georgian nobleman Khutlu-Bugha to David I of Imereti, an uncle of the executed monarch, bidding him send his son Vakhtang, whom he intended to put on the throne of Georgia, and to give him his sister Oljath in marriage. Vakhtang's reign was short-lived and died in 1292, without known issue.

Second marriage
After the death of her husband, Oljath married, with the consent of the Ilkhan, Vakhtang's cousin and successor, David VIII, a son of Demetrius II. David soon raised a rebellion against the Mongol hegemony and entrenched himself in the mountains of Mtiuleti. In 1298, Oljath was part of the delegation sent by David for negotiations with the Mongol commander Kutlushah, who treated the queen with special honor, she being a Mongol princess. Oljath was given assurances for the king's safety, as well as the ring and the napkin, the latter being a gage of pardon, while Sibuchi, son of Kutlushah, was offered as a hostage. The queen, however, was detained and, after David refused to arrive at negotiations in person, carried off to Iran. The Ilkhan determined that she should not again return to her husband. When David learned this, he, in 1302, married the daughter of Hamada Surameli. No children are reported in the medieval annals from the union of Oljath with David, but a modern hypothesis makes Melchizedek and Andronicus, the 13th-century princes of Alastani, known from the contemporaneous documents, their sons.

Third marriage 
Oljath's grand-nephew Öljaitü briefly took Damascus from Mamluks in 1312. It was when Mamluk emirs, former governor of Aleppo - Shams al-Din Qara Sonqur and governor of Tripoli - al-Afram defected to Öljaitü. Despite extradition requests from Egypt, ilkhan invested Qara Sonqur (now under new name - Aq Sonqur) with governorate of Maragheh and al-Afram with Hamadan. Qara Sonqur was given hand of Oljath on 17 January 1314 in exchange of a dowry worth 30.000 dinars. Qara Sonqur was killed by Abu Sa'id in 1328 in exchange of Timurtash's execution in 1327. Oljath's further life is unknown.

Notes

References

13th-century Mongolian people
14th-century Mongolian people
13th-century people from Georgia (country)
14th-century people from Georgia (country)
13th-century women from Georgia (country)
14th-century women from Georgia (country)
Borjigin
Queens consort from Georgia (country)
Remarried royal consorts
Women of the Mongol Empire